And Now That I'm in Your Shadow is the sixth studio album by American rock musician Damien Jurado. It was released on 10 October 2006 by Secretly Canadian.

Track listing

References

2006 albums
Damien Jurado albums